William A. Boos Jr. (September 27, 1922 – August 22, 2002) was a member of the Michigan House of Representatives during the 1960s representing a portion of Saginaw County.

Early life and education
Boos was born in Detroit in September 1922 and raised in Saginaw. He graduated from Michigan State University with an A.B. degree in 1947 and Detroit College of Law with a LL.B degree in 1951. He joined the United States Army, where he served in New Guinea in the Pacific theater during World War II.

Career
Elected to the House in 1960, Boos was also a delegate to the 1964 Democratic National Convention. Following his retirement from the Legislature, Boos was appointed by Governor George W. Romney to the Michigan Public Service Commission on May 15, 1967, where he served until July 2, 1971.

He was a member of the American Legion, the Veterans of Foreign Wars, and the Optimist Club.

Boos died on August 22, 2002, about a month short of his 80th birthday.

References

1922 births
2002 deaths
Politicians from Detroit
Democratic Party members of the Michigan House of Representatives
Detroit College of Law alumni
Michigan State University alumni
Michigan lawyers
United States Army personnel of World War II
20th-century American politicians
United States Army soldiers
20th-century American lawyers